Tears of Joy is a live double album by trumpeter/bandleader Don Ellis recorded in 1971 and released on the Columbia label.

Reception

Thom Jurek of Allmusic said "Tears of Joy is a Don Ellis classic. The sheer musical strength of this ensemble is pretty much unparalleled in his career. The trumpeter/leader had backed off—a bit—from some of his outlandish and beautifully excessive use of strange and unconventional time signatures, though there is no lack of pioneering experimentalism in tone, color, arrangement, or style. ...Ultimately, Tears of Joy stands as a singular achievement in a career full of them by a musical auteur whose creativity seemingly knew few if any bounds". On All About Jazz, Jim Santella observed "Tears of Joy marked a subtle change in the Don Ellis big band. The trumpeter was gradually drifting toward popular music, and he was beginning to use the new electronic technology to its best advantage. However, he continued to load each arrangement with the kinds of musical features that have always left their unique stamp on his undertakings. Ellis and his other soloists stretch out with virtuosity while complex rhythms and dense counterpoint fill the air, and the band's sections taunt each other with adventurous forays. ...Highly recommended, Tears of Joy represents vintage Don Ellis big band excitement at its best" The Penguin Guide to Jazz said "Tears of Joy is regarded by some as the best Don Ellis album. It's certainly bold and expansive".

Track listing 
All compositions by Don Ellis except as indicated

Side One:
 "Tears of Joy" - 2:58
 "5/4 Getaway" - 7:49
 "Bulgarian Bulge" - 4:54
 "Get It Together" (Sam Falzone) - 5:14

Side Two:
 "Quiet Longing" - 3:48
 "Blues in Elf" - 6:41
 "Loss" - 8:21

Side Three: 	
 "How's This for Openers?" - 8:37
 "Samba Bajada" (Hank Levy) - 11:31

Side Four:
 "Strawberry Soup" - 17:36
 "Euphoric Acid" (Fred Selden) - 4:25

Personnel 
Don Ellis – trumpet, flugelhorn, drums, arranger
Lonnie Shetter – Alto sax, woodwinds 
Fred Selden – alto saxophone, flute,  soprano saxophone, piccolo, alto flute, arranger 
Sam Falzone – tenor saxophone, clarinet, flute, arranger
Jon Clarke – bari sax, woodwinds
Paul Bogosian, Jack Caudill, Bruce Mackay – trumpet
Kenneth Nelson – French Horn
Jim Sawyers – trombone
Ken Sawhill – bass trombone
Doug Bixby – contrabass trombone, tuba
Milcho Leviev – piano, pianet, clavinet
Dennis Parker – bass
Ralph Humphrey, Ron Dunn – drums
Lee Pastora – congas
Earle Corry, Alfredo Ebat – violin
Ellen Smith – viola
Christine Ermacoff – cello
Hank Levy – arranger

References 

Don Ellis live albums
1971 live albums
Columbia Records live albums